The Hausberg is with 1335 m above sea level the Hausberg of Garmisch-Partenkirchen, Bavaria, Germany and is especially popular for hiking and mountain bike tours and in winter for skiing, as it is also part of the skiing area Garmisch.

Since 1969 the Hausbergbahn has been leading up the mountain.

Since 2002, the event site at the foot of the Hausberg has hosted the BMW Motorrad Days every first weekend in July.

References

External links

Garmisch-Partenkirchen
Mountains of Bavaria
One-thousanders of Germany